Grammoechus strenuus is a species of beetle in the family Cerambycidae. It was described by James Thomson in 1864, originally under the genus Atossa. It is known from Java.

References

Pteropliini
Beetles described in 1864